Malasar Peak is the partly ice-free peak in Ellsworth Mountains, Antarctica rising to 2841 m on the side ridge that trends 9.15 km from Mount Dalrymple on the main crest of northern Sentinel Range east-northeastwards to Robinson Pass.  It surmounts Embree Glacier to the southeast and Sabazios Glacier to the north.

The peak is named after the ancient and medieval fortress of Malasar in Southern Bulgaria.

Location
US mapping in 1961.

See also
 Mountains in Antarctica

Maps
 Newcomer Glacier.  Scale 1:250 000 topographic map.  Reston, Virginia: US Geological Survey, 1961.
 Antarctic Digital Database (ADD). Scale 1:250000 topographic map of Antarctica. Scientific Committee on Antarctic Research (SCAR). Since 1993, regularly updated.

Notes

References
 Malasar Peak. SCAR Composite Gazetteer of Antarctica
 Bulgarian Antarctic Gazetteer Antarctic Place-names Commission. (details in Bulgarian, basic data in English)

External links
 Malasar Peak. Copernix satellite image

Ellsworth Mountains
Bulgaria and the Antarctic
Mountains of Ellsworth Land